Kabel may refer to:

 Kabel (Haarlemmermeer), a hamlet in the Netherlands
 Kabel (Heerhugowaard), a hamlet in the Netherlands
 Kabel (typeface)